Dale Replay is a Spanish-language game show that premiered in the United States on February 17, 2017, on Univision. The show is hosted by Carlos Calderón with Francisca Lachapel and Alessandra Villegas as celebrity captains. This was based on the Netherlands game show Beste Kijkers (Dear Viewers) which was later called Telly Test in Belgium. The show was canceled after five episodes due to low ratings.

Gameplay
Dale Replay will challenge two teams on their television and pop culture knowledge. All television and internet content is fair play – from novelas to sports, entertainment shows to news, and viral videos. The teams are composed of a celebrity captain and one television super fan, will battle it out during five rounds to prove who is the top tele-fanatic.

Episodes

References

External links
 
Official website

2010s American game shows
Univision original programming
2017 American television series debuts
2017 American television series endings